M&J is the debut album of popular French singer and model Vanessa Paradis. It was released in 1988 and featured the hit single "Joe le taxi".

Background
The album's lead single was the song "Joe le taxi". The song became a hit in France, where it charted at number one, and in the UK, Belgium, Germany, Sweden, and Norway, reaching the top 10. The album's more acclaimed single was the tribute to Marilyn Monroe entitled "Marilyn & John".

The album marked the start of a collaboration between Vanessa Paradis and composer Franck Langolff that lasted until his death in 2006.

Track listing
All songs written by Étienne Roda-Gil (lyrics) and Franck Langolff (music)
 "Marilyn & John"  5:48
 "Maxou"  3:50
 "Le Bon Dieu est un marin"  4:28
 "Mosquito"  4:21
 "Soldat"  5:41
 "Joe le taxi"  3:56
 "Coupe coupe"  5:21
 "Chat ananas"  3:47
 "Scarabée"  6:25
 "Marilyn & John" [English Version]  5:46

Personnel

Daniel Adjadj - backing vocals
Patrick Bourgoin - saxophone
Ann Calvert - backing vocals
Bertrand Châtenet - arranger, engineer, mixing ("Le bon Dieu est un marin")
Joshua D'Arche - bass guitar, keyboards, programming & synthesizer ("Joe le taxi")
Freddy Della - harmonica
Jacques Denjean - string quartet arrangement ("Scarabée")
Jean-Luc Escriva - backing vocals
Carole Fredericks - backing vocals
Alain Ganne - saxophone
Katherine Hibbs - photography
Yvonne Jones - backing vocals

Christophe Josse - bass guitar, keyboards, programming & synthesizer ("Chat ananas")
Kiwi Concept - design
Franck Langolff - arranger, guitar, harmonica
Thierry Leconte - assistant mixing ("Le bon Dieu est un marin")
Alain Lubrano - assistant mixing ("Le bon Dieu est un marin")
Bruno Mylonas - mixing
Philippe Osman - arranger, bass guitar, keyboards, guitar, programming & synthesizer
François Ovide - guitar
Anne Papiri - backing vocals
Patrick Rousseau - percussion ("Joe le taxi")
Patrice Tison - guitar

Mixed at Studio Guillaume Tell, Suresnes

Charts

Certifications

References

1988 debut albums
Vanessa Paradis albums
Polydor Records albums
Barclay (record label) albums